Frederick John Baron (29 December 1901 – November 1993) was an English footballer who played as a forward. He played in the Football League for Liverpool and Southend United as well as in non-league football for Prudhoe Castle and Mid Rhondda United.

References

1901 births
1993 deaths
People from Prudhoe
Footballers from Northumberland
English footballers
Association football forwards
Prudhoe Castle F.C. players
Mid Rhondda F.C. players
Liverpool F.C. players
Southend United F.C. players
English Football League players